A list of the tallest structures in Slovakia. This list contains every type of structure in Slovakia. Please expand and correct.

References

External links 
 http://skyscraperpage.com/diagrams/?searchID=37735381
 http://www.solideurope.sk/TV_stanice.htm
 Air-traffic obstacle list

Tallest
Slovakia